John and the Missus is a 1986 Canadian drama film. The film was directed by and starred Gordon Pinsent who wrote the screenplay from his 1974 novel of the same name.

Plot 
John Munn (Pinsent) is a miner from a small Newfoundland town who gets laid off when the mine closes. Rather than leave the town for work, as everyone else has done, John sets out to save the town along with his wife The Missus (Burroughs).

Recognition 
 1987
 Genie Award for Best Music Score - Michael Conway Baker - Won
 Genie Award for Best Performance by an Actor in a Leading Role - Gordon Pinsent - Won
 Genie Award for Best Motion Picture - John HunterPeter O'Brian - Nominated
 Genie Award for Best Performance by an Actor in a Supporting Role - Roland Hewgill - Nominated
 Genie Award for Best Performance by an Actress in a Leading Role - Jackie Burroughs - Nominated
 Genie Award for Best Adapted Screenplay - Gordon Pinsent - Nominated

References

External links 
 
 
 Gordon Pinsent at  Canadian Theatre Encyclopedia

1986 films
1986 drama films
Canadian drama films
English-language Canadian films
Films set in Newfoundland and Labrador
Films shot in Newfoundland and Labrador
1986 directorial debut films
1980s Canadian films